Stephen S. Kudla  (born 1950 Caracas, Venezuela) is an American mathematician working in arithmetic geometry and automorphic forms.  He is a professor in the Department of Mathematics at the University of Toronto.

Life

After receiving his doctorate, Kudla spent a year at the Institute for Advanced Study in Princeton, following which he joined the faculty at the University of Maryland, College Park. Since 2006, he has been a Canada Research Chair Professor at the University of Toronto.

In 1997, he discovered relationships between the Fourier coefficients of derivatives of Siegel Eisenstein series and arithmetic invariants of Shimura varieties (heights pairings of arithmetic cycles).

He was a Sloan Fellow in 1981, received the Max-Planck Research Award in 2000, and the Jeffery–Williams Prize of the Canadian Mathematical Society in 2009. He was an Invited Speaker at the 2002 International Congress of Mathematicians in Beijing, where he gave a lecture on "Derivatives of Eisenstein series and arithmetic geometry". He is on the Scientific Review Panel of the Pacific Institute for the Mathematical Sciences (PIMS). Since 2004, he has been the co-editor of the Canadian Journal of Mathematics, and the co-organizer of several conferences at the Mathematical Research Institute of Oberwolfach.

Education
Ph.D. State University of New York at Stony Brook 1975; Dissertation: Real Points on Algebraic Varieties Defined by Quaternion Algebras. Advisor: Michio Kuga.

Selected publications
 with Michael Rapoport, T. Yang: Modular forms and special cycles on Shimura curves. In: Annals of Mathematics Studies. 161. Princeton University Press, Princeton, NJ, 2006. x+373 pages

References

Living people
20th-century American mathematicians
21st-century American mathematicians
Stony Brook University alumni
1950 births